The order of battle Chahar People's Anti-Japanese Allied Army in the Inner Mongolia campaign of 1933.

The Chahar People's Anti-Japanese Army consisted mostly of former Northwestern Army units under Feng Yuxiang, troops from Fang Zhenwu's Resisting Japan and Saving China Army, remnants of the provincial forces from Rehe, Anti-Japanese volunteers from Manchuria and local forces from Chahar and Suiyuan. The strength of the force was approximately 100,000 men.

Chahar People's Anti-Japanese Army
Chahar People's Anti-Japanese Army – Commander-in-Chief Feng Yuxiang
 Fang Zhenwu – director
 Ji Hongchang – frontline commander
Former Northwestern Army: – Ji Hongchang
 1st Corps – Tong Linge*
 1st Division  – Peng Zhengguo
 2nd Division  – Zhi Yinglin
 Independent Brigade – Liu Keyi
 24th Division – Fu Chun *
 25th Division – Ma Guanjun
 2nd Corps – Ji Hongchang
 3rd Cavalry Division – Zhou Yixuan
 4th Division – Xu Ronghua
 5th Division – Xuan Xiafu
 6th Division – Li Tingzhen
 6th Corps – Zhang Lingyun*
 Guerrilla Division – Mie Yuling*
 2nd Cavalry Division – Hu Yunshan
 Herald Corps – Sun Liangcheng*
 1st Column – Lei Zhongtian
 2nd Column – Gao Shuxun

Resisting-Japan and Saving-China Army: – Fang Zhenwu
 1st Corps – Zhang Renjie*
 ? Division – Song Tielin
 ? Division –  Du Guangming
 ? Division – Song Kebin *
 ? Brigade – Cui Guoqing
 Cavalry  Brigade – Gu Youqi
 4th Corps – Mi Wenhe
 Teaching Division  – Wang Zhongfu
 5th Corps – Ruan Xuanwu*
 16th Division  –  Ji Handong
 18th Division  –  Xu Quanzhong

Other allied forces 
 Northeastern Loyal and Brave Army – Feng Zhanhai*
  10th Cavalry Division – Deng Wenze +
  11th Cavalry Division – Tan Zixin *
  12th Cavalry Division – Wu Songlin
  21st Cavalry Brigade – Guo Fenglai
  1st Infantry Brigade – Tang Zhongxin
  Jehol Anti Japanese Militia or 18th Corps – Huang Shouzhong *
 32nd Division –  Huang Shouzhong
 33rd Division –  Tan Shilin
 34th Division –  Yan Shangyuan
 4th Cavalry Division  – Yao Jingchuan *
 Chahar Self-Defense Army – Zhang Lisheng *
 1st Division –  Zhang Ziguang
 2nd Division –  Cao Han
 3rd Division – Bai Zhenbao
 1st Detachment –  Wang De Zhong
 2nd Detachment – Jiao Pozhai
 13th Independent Division – Ren Ping Zhi
  Ethnic-Mongol army – Teh Wang
 1st Cavalry  – Teh Wang
 2nd Cavalry – Jodbajab
 Self-Defense Army – Fu Linga
 Bandits and former puppet troops
 1st Route – Wang Ying
 6th Route – Liu Guitang

Notes:
 * Given military commands or position to desert the Anti-Japanese Army cause by Song Zheyuan.
 + Assassinated.

Japanese and Manchurian forces in the Dolonor area 
Japan
 4th Cavalry Brigade – Major Gen. Mogi (over 2000 men and artillery)
 
Manchukuo 
 Detachment of the Taoliao Army – Li Shouxin
 Cui Xingwu Detachment – Cui Xingwu
 Liu Guitang Detachment – Liu Guitang

Chinese Forces sent against the Anti-Japan Allied Army 
Said to be 16 Divisions, including:
 
Shanxi Provincial forces closing the Shanxi / Chahar border – Yan Xishan

Suiyuan Provincial forces closing the Suiyuan / Chahar border 
 7th Army Group – Fu Zuoyi
 35th Army – Fu Zuoyi (concurrent)

Controlling Peiking – Suiyuan Railway. 
 17th Army – Xu Tingyao
 2nd Division – Huang Jie
 25th Division – Guan Linzheng
 1st Cavalry Brigade – Li Jiading
 87th Division – Wang Jingjiu

Units in the final battle against the Anti Japanese Army outside Beijing. 
 32nd Army – Shang Zhen
 129th Division
 130th Division
 41st Army – Pang Bingxun
 25th Division – Guan Linzheng

Sources 
 中国抗日战争正面战场作战记 (China's Anti-Japanese War Combat Operations)
 Guo Rugui, editor-in-chief Huang Yuzhang
 Jiangsu People's Publishing House
 Date published : 2005-7-1
 
 Online in Chinese: https://web.archive.org/web/20070928130306/http://www.wehoo.net/book/wlwh/a30012/04574.htm
 第二部分：从"九一八"事变到西安事变察哈尔民众抗日同盟军 1
 Part II : from the "September 18 Incident" to the Xi'an Incident: Anti-Japan military alliance

Anti-Japanese Allied Army
Second Sino-Japanese War